The 1969 Notre Dame Fighting Irish football team represented the University of Notre Dame during the 1969 NCAA University Division football season.  The Fighting Irish were led by sixth-year head coach Ara Parseghian and played their home games on campus at Notre Dame Stadium.

After 44 seasons without postseason play (1925–1968), the school ended its self-imposed bowl hiatus. With an  regular season record, the Irish were led on the field by junior quarterback Joe Theismann. They met top-ranked Texas in the Cotton Bowl in Dallas on New Year's Day, but lost 21–17 when the Longhorns scored a late touchdown.

Schedule

Roster

Game summaries

Northwestern

Purdue

Michigan State

Army

Southern Cal

Tulane

Navy

Pittsburgh

Georgia Tech

Air Force

vs. Texas (Cotton Bowl)

1970 NFL Draft

References

External links
 Sports Reference - 1969 Notre Dame football season

Notre Dame
Notre Dame Fighting Irish football seasons
Notre Dame Fighting Irish football